is a 2002 Japanese action film, which was directed by Atsushi Muroga. It starred Ryoko Yonekura and Shingo Tsurumi.

Cast
Ryoko Yonekura
Shingo Tsurumi

External links
 

2002 films
Girls with guns films
2000s Japanese films

ja:GUN CRAZY